A Jewish seminary is a Jewish educational institution.  See Hebrew Union College-Jewish Institute of Religion (Reform), Jewish Theological Seminary (Conservative), Yeshiva University (Orthodox), Reconstructionist Rabbinical College, Academy for Jewish Religion

A yeshiva is an institution for boys or young men focused on the study of religious texts, especially Torah study and the Talmud. These include mesivta for high school-aged boys and beit midrash or yeshiva gedola for men of college age.

A midrasha is an institute of Jewish studies for women, roughly equivalent to yeshiva. In Israel a midrasha that also offers academic degrees is sometimes called a machon. In the United States, midrasha may also be co-educational.

A kolel is an institute for advanced study of Talmudic or rabbinic literature. Students of a kolel are married men.

Bais Yaakov is a type of elementary and secondary school for Jewish girls from religious, especially Orthodox families.

See also 
 Rabbi, a teacher of Torah study